The 1968 Michigan State Spartans men's soccer team represented Michigan State University during the 1968 NCAA soccer season. The Spartans played at Spartan Stadium in East Lansing, Michigan and were coached by 13th-year head coach, Gene Kenney. The Spartans competed as an independent.

The 1968 season was one of the most successful season in program history, as they were declared NCAA co-champions along with the Maryland Terrapins, making it one of two seasons the Spartans won the NCAA title in men's soccer. The team was considered to be part of the 1960s golden age of Michigan State sports, where their wrestling and football teams also won national titles during that time.

Schedule 

|-
!colspan=6 style=""| Regular season
|-

|-
!colspan=6 style=""| NCAA Tournament
|-

|-

References

External links 

Michigan State Spartans men's soccer seasons
1968 NCAA soccer independents season
Michigan State Spartans soccer
NCAA Division I Men's Soccer Tournament-winning seasons
NCAA Division I Men's Soccer Tournament College Cup seasons
Michigan State Spartans 
Michigan State Spartans